Salome Daudi Mwambu (born 23 May 1954) is a Tanzanian CCM politician and Member of Parliament for Iramba East constituency since 2010.

References

1954 births
Living people
Chama Cha Mapinduzi MPs
Tanzanian MPs 2010–2015
Mwenge Secondary School alumni
University of Dar es Salaam alumni
Tanzanian schoolteachers